Jessica Gelibert (born 8 November 1994) is a Haitian hurdler who specializes in the 400 metres hurdles.

She won the bronze medal at the 2013 Pan American Junior Championships, finished eighth at the 2015 Pan American Games and competed at the 2018 Central American and Caribbean Games without reaching the final.

Her personal best time is 56.87 seconds, achieved in May 2014 in Jacksonville. She holds the Haitian record.

References

1994 births
Living people
Haitian female hurdlers
Athletes (track and field) at the 2015 Pan American Games
Pan American Games competitors for Haiti
Competitors at the 2018 Central American and Caribbean Games
Coastal Carolina University alumni
Coastal Carolina Chanticleers women's track and field athletes